HMS B5 was one of 11 B-class submarines built for the Royal Navy in the first decade of the 20th century. She survived World War I and was sold for scrap in 1921.

Design and description
The B class was an enlarged and improved version of the preceding A class. They displaced  on the surface and  submerged. The B-class submarines had a crew of two officers and thirteen ratings.

For surface running, the boats were powered by a single 16-cylinder  Vickers petrol engine that drove one propeller shaft. When submerged the propeller was driven by a  electric motor. They could reach  on the surface and  underwater.

The boats were armed with two 18-inch (450 mm) torpedo tubes in the bow. They could carry a pair of reload torpedoes, but generally did not as they would have to remove an equal weight of fuel in compensation.

Construction and career
B5 was built by Vickers at their Barrow-in-Furness shipyard, launched 14 November 1905 and completed 25 February 1906. When the war began in 1914, the boat was assigned to defend the Straits of Dover.  B5 was sold on 25 August 1921 to AJ Anderson, then sold again on 1 March 1922 to J Smith, Poole.

Notes

References
 
 
 
 
 

 

British B-class submarines
World War I submarines of the United Kingdom
Ships built in Barrow-in-Furness
Royal Navy ship names
1905 ships